René Sence (16 September 1920 – 14 January 1998) was a French sailor who competed in the 1972 Summer Olympics.

References

1920 births
1998 deaths
French male sailors (sport)
Olympic sailors of France
Sailors at the 1972 Summer Olympics – Dragon